Hanno Douschan (born 5 September 1989) is an Austrian snowboarder. He has represented Austria at the 2014 Winter Olympics in Sochi.

He participated at the FIS Freestyle Ski and Snowboarding World Championships 2019, winning a medal.

References

External links

 
 
 
 

1989 births
Snowboarders at the 2014 Winter Olympics
Snowboarders at the 2018 Winter Olympics
Living people
Olympic snowboarders of Austria
Austrian male snowboarders
Universiade medalists in snowboarding
Sportspeople from Klagenfurt
Universiade gold medalists for Austria
Competitors at the 2013 Winter Universiade
Competitors at the 2015 Winter Universiade